is Japanese singer-songwriter Ua's seventh single, released on February 21, 1997. It was used in Kanebō cosmetics T'Estimo II commercials.

"Amai Unmei" is Ua's best-selling single. It debuted with 43,920 units sold at #18 on the Oricon Weekly Singles Chart and later peaked at #10, becoming first top 10 entry and highest charting single. Despite the success of the single, "Amai Unmei" was not included in Ua's second album "Ametora". It was included for the first time in an album on Ua's first compilation Illuminate: The Very Best Songs. In 1998, an English-language version was recorded by the then-duo Double for their single "For Me".

"Amai Unmei" features a cover of Chiga Kahoru's 1969 hit "Mayonaka no Guitar".

Track listing

CD

Vinyl

Charts, certifications and sales

References

External links
 SPEEDSTAR RECORDS | UA 「甘い運命」

1997 singles
Ua (singer) songs
1997 songs